Ruby is the tenth studio album recorded by American singer-songwriter Macy Gray. Originally scheduled to be released on September 7, 2018 via Mack Avenue label, it was pushed back to September 21, 2018. The album also produced two singles.

Recording
The recording locations were 25th Street Studios, Oakland, CA; 3 Pillars Studio, Woodland Hills, CA; MXM Studios, Los Angeles, CA; Recon Studios, Tarzana, CA; Revival Studio, Los Angeles, CA; Studio Borgen, Partille, Sweden; VieTom Studios, Beverly Hills, CA.

Reception
Kyle Mullin of Exclaim! commented "Her chemistry with her bandmates, along with the album's producers, is evident. And there's little wonder why — Ruby gleams like a pristinely produced jewel in comparison to Gray's aptly named 2016 LP Stripped, which consisted of raw, overdub free takes for the singer and a small band". Simone Torn of The Spill Magazine stated "This album is appropriately called Ruby, because it’s a pure gem. Whoever says music has lost all soul clearly has never heard Gray’s new album".

Pablo Gorondi of The Detroit News wrote "Macy Gray sounds mainly joyful and enthusiastic on Ruby and the zest evident across her 10th album, even when the theme is misfortune or heartbreak, is infectious. Her trademark jazzy soul and R&B foundations are accounted for, but the arrangements have a deceptively light touch and let Gray’s vocals and effervescent personality shine through".

Track listing

Charts

References

External links

2018 albums
Jazz albums by American artists
Macy Gray albums
Mack Avenue Records albums